Nuacht RTÉ le TG4 (Irish for RTÉ and TG4 News) is the main news service for Irish speakers on RTÉ television. The service is broadcast from the  news studios at 
Baile na hAbhann in the Connemara Gaeltacht, County Galway, Ireland.a

Nuacht RTÉ le TG4 broadcasts daily at 5:00pm on the RTÉ News channel and at 5:40pm on RTÉ One with a repeat available on rte.ie and the RTÉ Player. The Angelus follows for 1 minute after Nuacht RTÉ at 6:00pm. Nuacht TG4 airs on TG4 weeknights at 7:00pm and weekends at 7:15pm.

The bulletin is presented and researched by a team of 42 staff who are employed in the research and presentation of both Nuacht RTÉ and Nuacht TG4. Three new technical positions have been created as a result of investment by RTÉ.

Nuacht RTÉ before relocation
Previously, Nuacht RTÉ had broadcast a summary of the main news headlines after the RTÉ News: One O'Clock. This bulletin had displayed subtitles in Irish, on the right half of the screen, taken directly from the autocue. It is no longer on air, but is still sometimes mistakenly advertised.

The former 5:20pm programme consisted of the main news stories of the day, a brief weather forecast (from the weather department) and a teaser for that evening's Nuacht TG4. It was presented mainly by Siún Nic Gearailt on weekdays, and by Brídóg Ni Bhuachalla on weekends.

Both of the above programmes were presented from the RTÉ News studio at the RTÉ headquarters in Donnybrook, Dublin 4.

Irish language news bulletins on RTÉ Radio 1, RTÉ 2fm and RTÉ Lyric FM are still presented from the RTÉ in Dublin, while those on RTÉ Raidió na Gaeltachta are presented from its headquarters in Casla, Conamara, County Galway.

References

Irish television news shows
RTÉ News and Current Affairs
RTÉ original programming